Mile End Delicatessen, is a Jewish deli in Boerum Hill, Brooklyn  which opened in 2010 and is named after the neighborhood in Montreal, Quebec, Canada. The deli has been highly rated and is currently run by Joel Tietolman.

The deli is known for their Montreal-Canadian spin on classic Jewish dishes, as well as their smoked meat.

Mile End Sandwich
Mile End Delicatessen opened a second location on Bond Street in Manhattan called Mile End Sandwich. Ligaya Mishan of The New York Times described the second location as lacking "the homeyness and pluck of its Brooklyn progenitor". Mile End Sandwich closed in October, 2018.

See also

 List of delicatessens

References

External links
 

2010 establishments in New York City
Jewish delicatessens in the United States
Jews and Judaism in Brooklyn
Restaurants established in 2010
Restaurants in Brooklyn